Barekese Dam is a dam on the Ofin River that supports the main water treatment plant for Kumasi in the Ashanti Region of Ghana, supplying about 80 percent of the potable water for the city and its surrounding environs. It is operated by the Ghana Water Company.

History
The Dam was built by Ghana's first President, Dr. Kwame Nkrumah. It was started in 1965, and completed in June 1969 with the aim of providing both water and electricity to the people of Kumasi.

References

Dams in Ghana
Embankment dams
Dams completed in 1969
Water supply and sanitation in Ghana
Hydroelectric power stations in Ghana
Ashanti Region